Fiona Stewart (born 15 May 1966) is an Australian lawyer, sociologist, author and former executive director of the pro-euthanasia group Exit International (2004-7). She is author of Killing Me Softly: Voluntary Euthanasia and the road to the Peaceful Pill and co-author of The Peaceful Pill Handbook (eHandbook version). Stewart authored the Peaceful Pill Handbook series.

Early life and career
Fiona Stewart was born in Melbourne, Australia in 1966. She was educated at Lauriston Girls' School. She received her BA from Monash University in 1987 followed by a Graduate Diploma in Public Policy (Melbourne University) in 1992, Master of Policy and Law (La Trobe University) in 1994 and her Ph.D. in health sciences from Latrobe in 1998.  She graduated from Charles Darwin University Law School in 2015. From 1997 to 1999 Stewart held a postdoctoral fellowship at Deakin University for the study of ‘Womens Lives: Choice, Change and Identity’. When her contract was not renewed, she turned to writing opinion columns for the media on Generation X and feminism.

Prior to working with Nitschke on The Peaceful Pill eHandbook and in Exit International, Stewart worked as an opinion writer for The Age, The Australian and other Australian papers and media outlets, and as an online learning consultant with Professor Dale Spender.

In 2001, Stewart founded the consumer complaints website Notgoodenough.org, where she was active in promoting the consumer standpoint and criticising big businesses such as Telstra, the national carrier.

She has participated widely in Australian public debate on varied current affairs issues.

Euthanasia

Fiona met euthanasia activist Philip Nitschke at the Brisbane Festival of Ideas in 2001 during the Late Night Live debate ‘There’s no such thing as a new idea’. The couple married in Las Vegas in 2009.

In the 2014 Victorian election she stood for the Upper House for the Voluntary Euthanasia Party.

Books
Stewart is the author of three books:

 Internet Communication and Qualitative Research; Sage, 2000 (With Dr Chris Mann)
 Killing Me Softly: Voluntary Euthanasia and the road to the Peaceful Pill; Penguin, 2005
 The Peaceful Pill Handbook series

See also

Terminal illness
Right to die
Euthanasia in Australia

References

1966 births
Living people
Euthanasia activists
Euthanasia in Australia
Monash University alumni
People educated at Lauriston Girls' School